Aegidius Ursinus de Vivere or Aegidius Ursinus de Vivariis (died 17 April 1647) was a Roman Catholic prelate who served as Titular Patriarch of Jerusalem (1641–1647).

Biography
Aegidius Ursinus de Vivere was born in Liège, Prince-Bishopric of Liège in 1577 or 1598.
On 15 April 1641, he was appointed during the papacy of Pope Urban VIII as Titular Patriarch of Jerusalem.
On 23 April 1641, and ordained a priest and on 28 Apr 1641, he was consecrated bishop by Antonio Marcello Barberini, Cardinal-Priest of San Pietro in Vincoli, with Faustus Poli, Titular Archbishop of Amasea, and Celso Zani, Bishop Emeritus of Città della Pieve, serving as co-consecrators. 
He served as Titular Patriarch of Jerusalem until his death on 17 April 1647.

References

External links and additional sources
 (for Chronology of Bishops) 
 (for Chronology of Bishops) 

17th-century Roman Catholic titular bishops
Bishops appointed by Pope Urban VIII
1577 births
1647 deaths
Patriarchs of Jerusalem